Sengelsberg may refer to:
 Sengelsberg (Böhne), a mountain of Hesse, Germany
 Sengelsberg (Mandern), a mountain of Hesse, Germany
 Sengelsberg (Niedenstein), a mountain of Hesse, Germany